John Socman is an opera in three acts by George Lloyd to a libretto by William Lloyd (the composer’s father). It was first performed by the Carl Rosa Opera Company at the Bristol Hippodrome, England on 15 May 1951. The work was one of three operatic commissions to mark the Festival of Britain (the others being The Pilgrim’s Progress and Billy Budd).

Lloyd, who had suffered shellshock while serving in the Royal Marines during the Second World War, had a breakdown after writing John Socman, and abandoned composition for twenty years.

Annette Phillips, director of Carl Rosa commented that George Lloyd was chosen for the 1951 Festival commission given the talent he had shown in his two previous operas, but that for financial reasons John Socman could not remain in the repertory, despite an enthusiastic reception from audiences. The producer was Dennis Arundell, and a single performance followed in Northern Ireland.

The vocal score was published in 1951. A complete studio recording from Manchester was broadcast by BBC Radio 3 on 7 February 1982, conducted by Edward Downes.

Roles

Synopsis
The opera is set in Wiltshire, in the aftermath of the Battle of Agincourt, in 1415.

On return from France, Richard discovers that his sweetheart Sybil is being pursued by John Socman who hopes to force her to marry him in order to avoid having her father, a follower of John Wycliffe, executed  as a heretic. Eventually Socman is revealed to have abandoned a wife years before.

Recordings
Lloyd: John Socman (Highlights) – Malcolm Rivers (baritone), Thomas Booth (tenor), Janice Watson (soprano), Michael George (bass), David Wilson-Johnson (bass), Diana Montague (soprano); Philharmonia Orchestra, London Voices; George Lloyd (conductor). Label: Albany Records 131.

Notes and references

External links
The George Lloyd Society

English-language operas
1951 operas
Operas
Operas set in England